Zruč-Senec is a municipality in Plzeň-North District in the Plzeň Region of the Czech Republic. It has about 3,500 inhabitants.

Administrative parts
The municipality is made up of the villages of Zruč and Senec. These two villages are urbanistically fused.

Geography
It lies in the Plasy Uplands. The Berounka River forms the southern municipal border.

History
The first written mention of Zruč is from 1252, the first written mention of Senec is from 1295. Between 1517 and 1850, both villages were in the property of Plzeň.

Between 1869 and 1930, Senec and Zruč were two separate municipalities. In 1950–1991, Senec was an administrative part of Zruč municipality. In 1991, the municipality was renamed Zruč-Senec.

Demographics

Sights
Zruč-Senec is known for the Air Park Zruč, which is a private collection of aircraft and military equipment. Exhibits are freely accessible to visitors.

Gallery

References

External links

Villages in Plzeň-North District